Elusa alector is a species of moth of the family Noctuidae. It was described by Alfred Ernest Wileman and Reginald James West in 1928, and is known from the Philippines, including Luzon.

References

Moths described in 1928
Hadeninae
Moths of the Philippines